Fort Monroe is a historic site in Yosemite National Park.  There are no longer remnants; it is a location only. The fort was not a military fort, but started as a stage station.  As various buildings were added or demolished, the general location acquired and kept the name well into the automobile age.  Prior to the building of the Wawona Tunnel in 1933, the Wawona Road passed next to it, at the point where the start of Pohono Trail was located. (The Pohono Trail includes part of what was the old Wawona Road.)

George Monroe

Fort Monroe was named for George F. Monroe, a stage driver for the Yosemite Stage Line.  The "fort" was a stage team relay station, and a place where stage line customers and other travelers camped.

Monroe came to California with his uncle from his native Georgia in 1856 to meet his parents who had recently moved to  Mariposa as part of the gold rush.  George was 12 at the time.  George's father Louis became a successful barber in Mariposa, and eventually bought and lived on a prosperous ranch south east of town.

In 1866 Monroe started working for the Wabash brothers, who ran the Yosemite Stage Line, and eventually got promoted to driver.  He was said to excel at taking the team over the treacherous road, which included many sharp drop offs at the side of the road and numerous tight switch backs.  He never had an accident that cost the company money nor injury to his passengers.  It is thought that an accident precipitated his own death at the age of 42.  According to one account, he was riding as a passenger in the stage when a horse got away from the driver, and George clambered to the front horse to stop the team, in the course of which he injured himself.  A few days later, after complaining of feeling ill, he died at his parents' ranch.  He was their only child.

Monroe was said to be well known to travelers from Europe, as well as throughout the United States.  Among his passengers over the years were presidents  Grant, Garfield and Hayes.

Later use of the "fort"
The location retained Monroe's name after his death.  It was always a site of significance, from the stage and horse era of the late 19th century, well into the automobile era when for a time it was an entrance station, and was said to have a fine automobile camp.  When the Wawona Tunnel was built, the upper road was converted into part of the Pohono Trail, whose starting point is now located at the Tunnel View parking lot.

Monroe Meadows
Monroe Meadows, in Yosemite Valley near Bridalveil Falls, is also named for George Monroe.

References

Attributions
 
 
 

Stagecoach stops in the United States
Yosemite National Park